The 2016 Kontinental Hockey League All-Star Game took place on January 23, 2016 at the VTB Ice Palace in Moscow, Russia, home of Dynamo Moskva, during the 2015–16 KHL season. Before the game, the players competed in the KHL skills competition.

Final roster 

The first six players for each conference were chosen via a fan vote. The next six were chosen by media and accredited journalists. The final five were selected by the KHL's competition committee.

Withdrawn
Prior to the draft several players withdrew due to injury:

Though Kaspars Daugaviņš participated in the skills competition, he would not play in the match due to an illness. He was not replaced.

Game summary

References 

Sports competitions in Moscow
Kontinental Hockey League All-Star Games
2015–16 KHL season